The Men's ski big air competition at the FIS Freestyle Ski and Snowboarding World Championships 2019 was held on February 2, 2019.

Qualification

Heat 1 
The qualification heat 1 was started at 12:00.

Heat 2 
The qualification heat 2 was started at 14:15.

Final
The final was started at 19:00. The best two runs counted for the total score.

References

Men's ski big air